In the 2018–19 season, ES Sétif competed in Ligue 1 for the 49th season. It was their 23rd consecutive season in the top flight of Algerian football. They also competed in the Champions League, Club Championship and the Algerian Cup.

Competitions

Overview

{| class="wikitable" style="text-align: center"
|-
!rowspan=2|Competition
!colspan=8|Record
!rowspan=2|Started round
!rowspan=2|Final position / round
!rowspan=2|First match
!rowspan=2|Last match
|-
!
!
!
!
!
!
!
!
|-
| Ligue 1

| 
| 5th
| 11 August 2018
| 26 May 2019
|-
| Algerian Cup

| Round of 64
| Semi-final
| 19 December 2018
| 25 April 2019
|-
| Champions League

| Group stage
| Semi-final
|  17 July 2018
|  23 October 2018
|-
| Club Championship

| First round
| Second round
| 31 July 2018
| 4 December 2018
|-
! Total

Ligue 1

League table

Results summary

Results by round

Matches

Algerian Cup

Champions League

Group stage

Group B

Knockout stage

Quarter-finals

Semi-finals

Club Championship Cup

First round

Second round

Squad information

Playing statistics

|-
! colspan=14 style=background:#dcdcdc; text-align:center| Goalkeepers

|-
! colspan=14 style=background:#dcdcdc; text-align:center| Defenders

|-
! colspan=14 style=background:#dcdcdc; text-align:center| Midfielders

|-
! colspan=14 style=background:#dcdcdc; text-align:center| Forwards

|-
! colspan=14 style=background:#dcdcdc; text-align:center| Players transferred out during the season

Goalscorers

Squad list
As of August 11, 2018.

Transfers

In

Out

Notes

References

2018-19
ES Sétif